The Beat Bullies are an American music production duo based in Atlanta, Georgia, United States, composed of Teeth Malloy, Nicholas Sherwood and Nsilo Reddick. They co-produced Chamillionaire's debut album The Sound of Revenge, and have worked with numerous Atlanta-based rappers including T.I. and Ludacris.

Career
Longtime friends and collaborators, Teeth Malloy and Nikki Broadway met while students at Morehouse College in Atlanta. Malloy, originally from Savannah, Georgia, grew up as a classically trained pianist, who played tenor saxophone and drums in his middle and high school bands. Broadway was raised in Boston with an art background, and started using turntables in high school. At the time they met, they were individually producing for various Atlanta University Center artists, and subsequently began working together as The Beat Bullies.

The Beat Bullies produced several tracks from Chamillionaire's debut album The Sound of Revenge, including "Grown and Sexy", "Southern Takeover" featuring Pastor Troy and Killer Mike, "Radio Interruption", and "Think I’m Crazy" featuring Natalie.

The Beat Bullies have also produced tracks for several albums including Carlos Santana's All That I Am ("My Man" featuring Mary J. Blige and Big Boi), Nelly's Suit ("She Don't Know My Name") and the Purple Ribbon All-Stars' Got Purp? Vol. 2.

References

Record producers from Georgia (U.S. state)
Record production teams